Agustín Neiman (born 6 January 1972) is an Argentine alpine skier. He competed in two events at the 1992 Winter Olympics.

References

1972 births
Living people
Argentine male alpine skiers
Olympic alpine skiers of Argentina
Alpine skiers at the 1992 Winter Olympics
People from Neuquén Province